Zhaire Jahi-ihme Smith (born June 4, 1999) is an American professional basketball player. He played college basketball for Texas Tech.

High school career
Smith attended Lakeview Centennial High School, where he was coached by J. T. Locklear. He averaged 20.1 points, 6.6 rebounds and 3.0 assists per game as a senior. Smith earned District 10-6A MVP honors and was voted the best dunker in the Dallas region by area coaches. Coming out of high school, Smith was a three-star recruit and chose Texas Tech over Arkansas, Georgia Tech, Kansas State, Memphis, Oregon, and Texas.

College career
In his freshman season at Texas Tech, he averaged 11.3 points and five rebounds per game. He was an honorable mention Big-12 selection and was named to the conference's All-Defensive team. Alongside Keenan Evans, Smith led Texas Tech to the Elite Eight of the NCAA Tournament, where they lost to eventual champion Villanova. Smith had a career-high 21 points and to go along with eight rebounds, three steals and two assists in a February 7 win over Iowa State. He flirted with a triple-double with 18 points, nine rebounds and seven assists in a 69-66 victory in the Round of 32 of the NCAA Tournament versus Florida, and posted several highlight-reel dunks.

Following the season, he declared for the 2018 NBA draft without initially hiring an agent. In late April it was announced that Smith signed with Roc Nation Sports, thus ending his collegiate eligibility.

Professional career

Philadelphia 76ers (2018–2020)
On June 21, 2018, Smith was selected with the sixteenth overall pick by the Phoenix Suns in the 2018 NBA draft, but was immediately traded, along with the Miami Heat's 2021 first round pick, to the Philadelphia 76ers for Mikal Bridges. On July 2, he signed with the 76ers. On August 6, he fractured his foot at a summer development camp and required surgery. On August 10, 2018, the surgery to repair an acute Jones fracture of the fifth metatarsal in Smith's left foot was successful. A month later in September, Smith went through a thoracoscopy due to an allergic reaction relating to ingesting sesame, which caused further problems in his road to recovery. While general manager Elton Brand expressed doubt that he would be able to play for the 76ers in the regular season, Smith made his debut with the Delaware Blue Coats for the NBA G League on March 1, 2019 against the Maine Red Claws. He averaged 7.2 points with 3.0 rebounds and 1.5 assists in 11 G-League games with the Blue Coats, starting five.

Smith made his NBA debut on March 25, 2019 in a 119-98 loss to the Orlando Magic, scoring three points with a steal and one rebound in five and a half minutes of play. In his rookie season, Smith averaged 6.7 points, 2.2 rebounds, 1.7 assists and 18.5 minutes played in six games (two starts) including 17 points, four rebounds and five assists when he started the final game of the regular season against the Chicago Bulls. Smith also played in two games during the 2019 NBA Playoffs with the 76ers, albeit with limited production in either game.

As a result of an allergic reaction, Smith lost weight and reworked his shot in his second professional season. He started the season for the Blue Coats shooting 4-of-18 from behind the arc, but improved his shooting since December. On February 27, 2020, Smith had 16 points and six rebounds, shooting 7-for-16 from the floor in a 125-106 loss to the Wisconsin Herd.

On November 23, 2020, Smith was traded to the Detroit Pistons in exchange for Tony Bradley. On November 30, Smith was waived by the Pistons.

On December 15, 2020, Smith signed with the Memphis Grizzlies, but was waived the next day.

Smith was included in the roster of the Memphis Hustle of the NBA G League in 2021 but did not play a game for the team.

Career statistics

NBA

Regular season

|-
| style="text-align:left;"|
| style="text-align:left;"|Philadelphia
| 6 || 2 || 18.5 || .412 || .375 || .750 || 2.2 || 1.7 || .3 || .3 || 6.7
|-
| style="text-align:left;"|
| style="text-align:left;"|Philadelphia
| 7 || 0 || 4.6 || .273 || .000 || .500 || .3 || .3 || .4 || .0 || 1.1
|- class="sortbottom"
| style="text-align:center;" colspan="2"|Career
| 13 || 2 || 11.0 || .378 || .316 || .667 || 1.2 || .9 || .4 || .2 || 3.7

Playoffs

|-
| style="text-align:left;"|2019
| style="text-align:left;"|Philadelphia
| 2 || 0 || 2.5 ||  ||  ||  || .0 || .0 || .5 || .0 || .0
|- class"sortbottom"
| style="text-align:center;" colspan="2"| Career
| 2 || 0 || 2.5 ||  ||  ||  || .0 || .0 || .5 || .0 || .0

College

|-
| style="text-align:left;"|2017–18
| style="text-align:left;"|Texas Tech
| 37 || 21 || 28.4 || .556 || .450 || .717 || 5.0 || 1.8 || 1.1 || 1.1 || 11.3

Personal life
Smith has a peanut allergy.

References

External links

 Texas Tech Red Raiders bio

1999 births
Living people
African-American basketball players
American men's basketball players
Basketball players from Texas
Delaware Blue Coats players
People from Garland, Texas
Philadelphia 76ers players
Phoenix Suns draft picks
Shooting guards
Sportspeople from the Dallas–Fort Worth metroplex
Texas Tech Red Raiders basketball players
21st-century African-American sportspeople